Vache, sometimes written as Vatché or Vaché, may refer to:

Places
Île à Vache, a small island lying off the south-west peninsula of Haiti.
La Vache, a cave in located in the Northern Range, on the north coast of Trinidad.
The Vache, an estate near Chalfont St. Giles in Buckinghamshire.
Rivière aux Vaches, a tributary of the Saint-François River in Quebec, Canada

People

Historical / mononym
Vache of Iberia, 3rd century king
Vache I of Albania (3rd century), the second Arsacid ruler of Caucasian Albania
Vache II of Albania (5th century), king of Caucasian Albania
 (died c. 1232), Armenian prince (with the title Prince of Princes) and founder of the Vachutian dynasty
Vache II Amberdtsi (13th century), Armenian prince of the Vachutian dynasty
Vache III Amberdtsi (13th-14th century), Armenian prince of the Vachutian dynasty
Vache of Kakheti (died 839), prince and chorepiscopus of Kakheti in eastern Georgia from 827 to 839

Contemporary given name
Vatche Arslanian (1955–2003), member of the Canadian Red Cross and head of logistics for the International Committee of the Red Cross (ICRC) in Iraq
Vatche Boulghourjian, Lebanese Armenian film director
Vache Gabrielyan (born 1968), Armenian politician
Vache Hovsepyan (1925-1978), Armenian musician and duduk player
Vache Sharafyan (born 1966), Armenian composer
Vache Tovmasyan (born 1986), Armenian actor, comedian, and showman

Surname
Allan Vaché (born 1953), American jazz clarinetist, son of Warren Vaché Sr.
Charles Vaché (1926-2009), bishop of The Episcopal Church in Virginia
Jacques Vaché (1895–1919), friend of André Breton and a chief inspiration behind the Surrealist movement
Tex Vache (1888–1953), American baseball player
Warren Vaché Sr. (1914-2005), American jazz musician and journalist
Warren Vaché Jr. (born 1951), American jazz musician, son of Warren Vaché Sr.

Others
Vache (grape), another name for the French wine grape Mondeuse noire

Georgian masculine given names